Abu Said Uthman ibn Abd al-Haqq (1196 – 1240) was a Marinid leader and son of Abd al-Haqq I.

After the death of his father in 1217, he became sheikh and during his reign fought for control of Morocco against the Almohad Caliphate. In 1240 Uthman was killed by one of his Christian slaves.

References
Clifford Edmund Bosworth. The New Islamic Dynasties. Columbia University Press, 1996 pg. 41

1240 deaths
13th-century Berber people
13th-century monarchs in Africa
13th-century Moroccan people
Marinid dynasty
Year of birth unknown